Zapata Formation is a sedimentary formation of Lower Cretaceous age in the Magallanes or Austral Basin of Argentina and Chile. Much of the formation is folded and faulted as consequence of the Andean orogeny. In outcrops of the Zapata Formation near Torres del Paine, the southernmost fossil of the ichthyosaur genus Platypterygius has been found.

References

Bibliography 
 Fildani, Andrea, Romans, B.W., Fosdick, J.C., Crane, W.H., and Hubbard, S.M. (2008). Orogenesis of the Patagonian Andes as reflected by basin evolution in southernmost South America, in Spencer, J.E., and Titley, S.R., eds., Ores and orogenesis: Circum-Pacific tectonics, geologic evolution, and ore deposits: Arizona Geological Society Digest 22: 259-268

Further reading 
 M. R. Schultz, A. Fildani, and M. Suarez. 2003. Occurrence of the southernmost South American ichthyosaur (Middle Jurassic), Parque Nacional Torres del Paine, Patagonia, southernmost Chile. Palaios 18:69-73

Geologic formations of Chile
Geologic formations of Argentina
Lower Cretaceous Series of South America
Cretaceous Argentina
Cretaceous Chile
Fossiliferous stratigraphic units of South America
Paleontology in Chile
Berriasian Stage
Hauterivian Stage
Shale formations
Sandstone formations
Deep marine deposits
Turbidite deposits
Formations
Geology of Magallanes Region
Geology of Santa Cruz Province, Argentina